The Tachikawa Ki-55 was a Japanese advanced trainer.

Design and development
The excellent characteristics of the Tachikawa Ki-36 made it potentially ideal as a trainer. This led  to the development of the Ki-55 with a single machine gun. After successful testing of a prototype in September 1939, the type was put into production as the Tachikawa Army Type 99 Advanced Trainer.

In all 1,389 Ki-55 were constructed before production ended in December 1943 with Tachikawa having built 1078 and Kawasaki 311.

Both the Ki-55 and the Ki-36 were given the Allied nickname 'Ida.'

Variants
Ki-36  Army co-operation aircraft.
Ki-72  An evolved version with a  Hitachi Ha38 engine and retractable undercarriage. Not built.

Operators
 

 Imperial Japanese Army Air Force

 Kumagaya Army Flying School
 Mito Army Flying School
 Tachiarai Army Flying School
 Utsonomiya Army Flying School

 Manchukuo Air Force
 Reorganized National Government of China
 National Government of China Air Force received several from the Japanese.

 Republic of China Air Force operated captured aircraft.

 People's Liberation Army Air Force operated more than 30 captured aircraft at the end of 1945. These Ki-55s were used until the last 14 retired in 1953.

 Royal Thai Air Force

Francillon also mentions delivery to the Japanese satellite air force of Cochinchina, the southernmost third part of present Vietnam

Specifications (Ki-55)

See also

References

Notes

Bibliography
  (new edition 1987 by Putnam Aeronautical Books); 3rd edition 1987, Putnam Aeronautical Books. .)

Ki-55
Ki-55, Tachikawa
Single-engined tractor aircraft
Low-wing aircraft
Aircraft first flown in 1939